

This is a list of the National Register of Historic Places listings in Blount County, Tennessee.

This is intended to be a complete list of the properties and districts on the National Register of Historic Places in Blount County, Tennessee, United States.  Latitude and longitude coordinates are provided for many National Register properties and districts; these locations may be seen together in a map.

There are 74 properties and districts listed on the National Register in the county.  Another 5 properties were previously listed but have been removed.

Current listings

|}

Former listings
Three other sites were previously listed, but have been removed:

|}

See also

 List of National Historic Landmarks in Tennessee
 National Register of Historic Places listings in Tennessee

References

Blount